John XII may refer to:

 Pope John XII, ruled 955–964
 John XII bar Maʿdani, Syriac Orthodox Patriarch of Antioch 1252–1263
 John XII of Constantinople, Ecumenical Patriarch 1294–1303
 Pope John XII of Alexandria, ruled 1480–1483
 John XII Peter El Hajj, Maronite Patriarch of Antioch 1890–1898